The Church of la Asunción (Spanish: Iglesia Parroquial de Santa María de la  Asunción) is a Renaissance-style, Roman Catholic church located in Hellín, Spain. It was declared Bien de Interés Cultural in 1981.

The church was erected in the 16th century. The chapels were refurbished in various styles and centuries. The main portal was erected in Renaissance style.

References 

Asuncion (Hellin)
Bien de Interés Cultural landmarks in the Province of Albacete
16th-century Roman Catholic church buildings in Spain
Renaissance architecture in Castilla–La Mancha